P2, P02, P.2, or P-2 might refer to several subjects:

Technology
 P2 (storage media), a "Professional Plug-in" solid state data storage technology employed by Panasonic
 DSC-P2, a Sony Cyber-shot P series camera model
 Honda P2, a 1996 Honda P series of robots, an ASIMO predecessor
 Intel 80286, 2nd generation processor architecture
 Pentium II, 6th generation Intel central processing unit
 Samsung P2, a 2007 flash memory based Yepp portable media player
 P2 audio connector, see Phone connector (audio)

Science
 Bacteriophage P2, a temperate phage of the family Myoviridae that infects E. coli
 P2 laboratory, biosafety-level-2 laboratory
 P2 receptor, a purinergic and pyrimidinergic cell surface receptor
 P2, a pulmonic valve closure sound
 Nix (moon) (former designation P2), a moon of Pluto
 P200 or P2, a component of brain evoked-response potential 
 ATC code P02 Anthelmintics, a subgroup of the Anatomical Therapeutic Chemical Classification System
 Buffer P2, a lysis buffer solution 
 Period 2, of the periodic table
 Pollution prevention in the US, an environmental management strategy emphasizing avoiding waste rather than treating it
 Diphosphorus, an inorganic chemical
 SARS-CoV-2 Zeta variant, one of the variants of SARS-CoV-2, the virus that causes COVID-19

Transportation
 P2 transport, a World War II passenger ship/troop ship design of the United States Maritime Commission
 P2, a State 1st class road in Latvia
 LNER Class P2, a class of 6 British 2-8-2 locomotives designed by Sir Nigel Gresley

Aircraft
 P-2 Hawk, a variant of the 1923 P-1 Hawk biplane fighter of the United States Army Air Corps
 P-2 Neptune, known as "P2V Neptune" until 1962, a United States Navy maritime patrol and antisubmarine warfare aircraft introduced in 1947
 Piaggio P.2, a 1923 Italian fighter prototype
 Pilatus P-2,  a Swiss Air Force trainer aircraft in service from 1946 to 1981
 Polikarpov P-2, a Soviet Polikarpov biplane trainer prototype

Automobiles
 Alfa Romeo P2, an iconic 1920s racing automobile
 Prodrive P2, an automobile built by Prodrive
 Volvo P2 platform, an automobile platform

Entertainment
 P2 (film), a 2007 suspense/thriller film directed by Franck Khalfoun
 P2 virus, a fictional virus in the novel The Second Angel
 DR P2, a Danish radio channel playing classical music and jazz, literary programming and radio dramas 
 NRK P2, a Norwegian radio channel playing cultural programming operated by Norsk rikskringkasting
 Sveriges Radio P2, a Swedish radio channel playing classical music, jazz and world music operated by Sveriges Radio
 Persona 2, 1999 and 2000 role-playing video games by Atlus
 Portal 2, a 2011 puzzle-platform video game by Valve
 Postal 2, a 2003 first-person shooter by Running with Scissors
 "P2" (song), a 2020 song by Lil Uzi Vert from the album Eternal Atake

Other uses
 P2 (panel building), a design for blocks of flats used in East Germany
 Papyrus 2 (P2), a papyrus New Testament manuscript 
 Propaganda Due, an Italian Masonic lodge, legal 1945–76 and afterwards clandestine and conspiratorial